Saint Patrick's Church is a Catholic parish in the Archdiocese of Dubuque, and is located at 15th and Iowa Streets, Dubuque, Iowa, United States. The church and rectory were included as contributing properties in the Jackson Park Historic District that was listed on the National Register of Historic Places in 1986.  St. Patrick's Church is located two blocks away from St. Mary's Church.  The reason for the close proximity of the two parishes was that St. Mary was originally built for service to German families of Dubuque, and St. Patrick's provided services for the Irish settlers to Dubuque.

History

The parish was founded in 1852 as a mission of St. Raphael Cathedral.  The parish buildings were built on land that Bishop Mathias Loras had purchased when it was offered for sale by the Federal government.  Originally, a wood-frame building was used as a church building, and was located at what is now the front of the rectory. The first church was dedicated by Bishop Loras in 1853. St. Patrick's became an independent parish five years later when the Rev. Patrick McCabe was assigned as the first resident pastor.  The cornerstone of the present brick church was laid in 1877, and the building dedicated on August 15, 1878.  In 1928, the Rev. J.J. Hanley remodeled and enlarged the church.

St. Patrick Church was originally built for service to the Irish settlers of Dubuque and while the parish has maintained a healthy respect for its Irish heritage over its many years of service, the parish now specializes in service to the Hispanic residents of Dubuque.  The parish offers a Spanish Mass on Sundays, and the offices of Hispanic ministry are also located at the parish.  From 1995 to 2008 a pastoral administrator led the St. Patrick's congregation.  During that same time, from 1999 to 2010, St. Patrick's was clustered with St. Mary's Parish.  St. Mary's closed in May 2010 and St. Patrick's was clustered with St. Raphael's Cathedral at that time.

Architecture

St. Patrick's Church was designed by Dubuque architect John Keenan in the Gothic Revival style.  It is a brick structure built on a Dubuque stone foundation.  It features a central tower that is capped with a crown.  The main entrance has been altered in subsequent years, but it fits in with the older structure.  The church building is seven bays long with the seventh bay on the south end forming a sort of transept.  The bays are divided by brick buttresses and each bay contains a paired lancet window.  The interior is divided into three naves.

The rectory was built in the 1880s to the rear of the church.  It is a three-story brick residence capped with a mansard roof.  The original porch has been replaced with a single-story addition.  Other additions have also been added on the west side of the house.

A school building, no longer extant, was built immediately west of the church.  It was replaced by a three-story structure in 1951 on the corner of West 15th and Main Streets.  The parish sold the building in 2006.  It is not considered an historic structure.

Schools
St. Patrick's Parish had a parochial school for boys established after 1870, while girls attended St. Joseph Academy. St. Patrick's School merged with St. Mary's Catholic School to form Downtown Catholic School in 1982.  The organization Holy Family Catholic Schools took control of Downtown Catholic and other Dubuque-area Catholic schools in 2001. Downtown Catholic and Sacred Heart – Holy Trinity School became St. Francis School in 2002, and St. Francis closed in 2004. Four Oaks Family and Children Services bought the school building in 2006.

References

External links
St. Raphael-St. Patrick website

Religious organizations established in 1852
1852 establishments in Iowa
Irish-American culture in Iowa
Roman Catholic churches completed in 1878
19th-century Roman Catholic church buildings in the United States
Patrick
Gothic Revival church buildings in Iowa
Churches on the National Register of Historic Places in Iowa
National Register of Historic Places in Dubuque, Iowa
Historic district contributing properties in Iowa